In mathematics, a topological space  is called collectionwise normal if for every discrete family Fi (i ∈ I) of closed subsets of  there exists a pairwise disjoint family of open sets Ui (i ∈ I), such that Fi ⊆ Ui.
An equivalent definition  of collectionwise normal demands that the above Ui (i ∈ I) are themselves a discrete family, which is stronger than pairwise disjoint.

Some authors assume that  is also a T1 space as part of the definition.

The property is intermediate in strength between paracompactness and normality, and occurs in metrization theorems.

Properties

A collectionwise normal space is collectionwise Hausdorff.
A collectionwise normal space is normal.
A Hausdorff paracompact space is collectionwise normal.Note: The Hausdorff condition is necessary here, since for example an infinite set with the cofinite topology is compact, hence paracompact, and T1, but is not even normal.

A metrizable space is collectionwise normal.
Every normal countably compact space (hence every normal compact space) is collectionwise normal.Proof: Use the fact that in a countably compact space any discrete family of nonempty subsets is finite.
An Fσ-set in a collectionwise normal space is also collectionwise normal in the subspace topology. In particular, this holds for closed subsets.
The  states that a collectionwise normal Moore space is metrizable.

Hereditarily collectionwise normal space

A topological space X is called hereditarily collectionwise normal if every subspace of X with the subspace topology is collectionwise normal.

In the same way that hereditarily normal spaces can be characterized in terms of separated sets, there is an equivalent characterization for hereditarily collectionwise normal spaces. The following conditions are equivalent:
 X is hereditarily collectionwise normal.
 Every open subspace of X is collectionwise normal.
 For every separated family  of subsets of X, there exists a pairwise disjoint family of open sets , such that .

Examples of hereditarily collectionwise normal spaces

 Every linearly ordered topological space (LOTS)
 Every generalized ordered space (GO-space)
 Every metrizable space
 Every monotonically normal space

Notes

References

 Engelking, Ryszard, General Topology, Heldermann Verlag Berlin, 1989. 

Properties of topological spaces